Alfred Sands Pell (March 1, 1786 – April 28, 1831) was an American merchant who died at sea in 1831.

Early life
Pell was born in New York in September 1779.  He was the second son of shipping merchant Benjamin Pell (–1828) and Marianna (née Ferris) Pell (1757-1795), who married in 1778. Among his siblings were William Ferris Pell (husband of Mary Shipley); Gilbert Titus Pell (husband of Elizabeth Birkbeck, a daughter of Morris Birkbeck, and father of Morris Birkbeck Pell), and representative in the Illinois Legislature, who was appointed United States envoy to Mexico in the 1850s; and Maria Pell (wife of Jacob T. Walden).  His family were among the largest landowners along the Hudson River.

His paternal grandparents were Joshua Pell (son of Thomas Pell, 3rd Lord of Pelham Manor and grandson of Sir John Pell, 2nd Lord of Pelham Manor) and Phoebe (née Palmer) Pell (daughter of John Palmer).  His great-great grandfather, Sir John Pell was the nephew of the 1st Lord, Thomas Pell, who acquired Pelham Manor from the Siwanoy Indians in 1645.  His maternal grandparents were John Ferris and Marianna (née Hunt) Ferris.

Career
Pell followed in his father's career and became a wealthy merchant with Pell & Co., which imported mahogany and marble before becoming an auction house that later went into financing.

In 1827, Pell purchased a 114 acre estate in Esopus on the Hudson River, just north of Esopus Island, from John Johnston Cameron while, at the same time, also purchasing a 143 acre tract on the Hudson at the northern end of what is now West Park. Upon his death, his eldest son Robert inherited these estates.

Personal life
Pell was married to Adelia Duane (1765–1860), a daughter of Mary (née Livingston) Duane (the eldest surviving daughter of Robert Livingston, 3rd Lord of Livingston Manor) and James Duane, a signer of the Articles of Confederation, first post-colonial Mayor of New York City, and first Judge of the United States District Court for the District of New York. Adelia's sister, Mary Duane, was the wife of Gen. William North, and another sister, Sarah Duane, was the wife of geologist and geographer George William Featherstonhaugh. Together, Adelia and Alfred were the parents of:

 Robert Livingston Pell (1811–1880), who married Maria Louisa Brinckerhoff, a daughter of James Lefferts Brinckerhoff and granddaughter of Robert Troup, in 1837.
 James Duane Pell (1813–1881), who married his cousin, Sophia Gertrude (1815–1885), daughter of William Ferris Pell, in 1838.
 John Augustus Pell (1816–1894), who married Susan Marie Field (1827–1893).
 George Washington Pell (1820–1896), the Consul to the Rhenish provinces who married Mary Bruen (d. 1890).
 Richard Montgomery Pell (1822–1882), who married Frances Mary Jones (1839–1930), a daughter of Samuel T. Jones. After his death, she married Louis Thurston Hoyt.

Pell died at sea on April 28, 1831, and was buried at Green-Wood Cemetery in Brooklyn. His widow died in 1860.

Legacy
Pell Street in Manhattan was named in his family's honor.

References

External links

1786 births
1831 deaths
People from New York (state)
Pell family
Duane family
People who died at sea